Class 66 may refer to:
British Rail Class 66, a type of EMD freight locomotive
EMD Class 66, an adaption of the above locomotive
DB Class 66, a Deutsche Bundesbahn 2-6-4T steam locomotive
NSB Class 66, an electric multiple unit train used by the Norwegian State Railways

See also
German Type U 66 submarine, or U-66-class